Amhi Doghe Raja Rani is a Marathi movie released on 31 December 1986.

Cast 

Laxmikant Berde as Raja Joshi
Tejashri as Madhurani O. Thakur
Sharad Talwalkar as Omkar Thakur
Atmaram Bhende as Joshi
Vijay Kadam as Balya
Sanjay Jog as Dr. Satish Shah
Suhasini Deshpande as Mrs. Joshi
Indu Navalkar as Balya's mother
Archana Pandare as Balya's wife

Soundtrack
The music has been directed by Ram Laxman.

Track listing

References

External links 
 Movie Review - gomolo.com
Movie Details - knowyourfilms.com
Movie Review - imindb.com

1986 films
1980s Marathi-language films